The ProRodeo Hall of Fame and Museum of the American Cowboy was opened in August 1979 as a museum designed to "preserve the legacy of the cowboy contests, the heritage and culture of those original competitions, and the champions of the past, present and future." It is located in Colorado Springs, Colorado, and only inducts Professional Rodeo Cowboys Association and Women's Professional Rodeo Association members. It is the "only museum in the world devoted exclusively to the sport of professional rodeo."

Inductees
Since the Hall’s opening in 1979, 279 people, 35 livestock, and 30 rodeo committees have been inducted. More than 100 individuals are nominated each year, but only a few are selected. For a complete list of inductees, see List of ProRodeo Hall of Fame inductees. Notable inductees include:

Humans
Jim Shoulders, won 16 world championships
Chris LeDoux, 1970s professional rodeo cowboy and country music star, won a bareback riding world championship
Ty Murray, seven-time all-around world champion, two-time bull riding world champion
Tuff Hedeman, three-time bull riding world champion
Charles Sampson, first African-American world champion rodeo cowboy
Larry Mahan, six-time all-around world champion
Roy Cooper, won six tie-down roping world championships
Charmayne James, was an 11-time WPRA world champion barrel racer and seven-time NFR barrel racing average  champion
Slim Pickens, actor/rodeo clown
Ben Johnson, steer roper/Oscar-winning actor
Lane Frost, 1987 world champion bull rider, won seven-match Challenge of the Champions with bull Red Rock
Casey Tibbs, saddle bronc rider/actor
Don Gay, eight-time bull riding world champion
Lewis Feild, three-time all-around world champion, two-time bareback riding world champion
Fred Whitfield, eight-time tie-down roping world champion
Trevor Brazile, won 26 world championships, the most of any PRCA contestant

Horses
 Steamboat, a gelding bronc, was inducted 1979; he is the model of the Wyoming state trademark, Bucking Horse and Rider, with the rider having been Clayton Danks, a Nebraska native who died in 1970 in Thermopolis, Wyoming
 Scamper, barrel racing, was inducted in 1996
Star Plaudit “Red”,  a barrel racing horse, won two world championships in a single season
 Midnight, a saddle bronc, was inducted in 1979
 Gray Wolf, sire, many of the best bucking horses today descend from Gray Wolf, inducted in 2016
War Paint, a saddle bronc, was three-time bucking horse of the year, and inducted in 2011
 Descent, a saddle bronc, despite an injury at the beginning of the '70s, returned to win his fifth and sixth bucking horse of the year award, and was inducted in 1979
 Scottie, steer wrestling, chestnut gelding, was able to take three cowboys to four world championships. Many liked him because he did not tire easily, enabling multiple cowboys to show him in quick succession

Bulls
 Skoal Pacific Bell, bull riding, only ridden five times in 150 outs, he also was the only three-time PRCA world champion bull in history, and was inducted in 2007
 Bodacious, bull riding, was one of two bulls to win the PBR and PRCA world champion and the inaugural champion bull of the PBR, inducted in 1999
 Crooked Nose, was the only fighting bull inducted, loved by fans and dreaded by bullfighters, and inducted in 1990
 Red Rock, unridden in 309 outs in his pro rodeo career (though he was ridden by Lane Frost in 1988, it was not actually a PRCA-sanctioned event), inducted in 1990
 Old Spec, ridden 7 times in 350 outs, was inducted in 1979
 Oscar, in 300 outs, only eight riders rode him, including Don Gay three times (twice he was ridden for 97 points), he then became a legend in breeding. In fact, the renowned Bushwacker and many other great bulls came from Oscar. He was also featured in the Disney documentary film, The Great American Cowboy, and was inducted in 1979
 Tornado, bucking off 220 cowboys before being ridden by Freckles Brown, was inducted in 1979

Pioneer Award
Earl W. Bascom, recipient of the Pioneer Award 2016, was a rodeo-equipment inventor, world record time holder, actor, and artist/sculptor.

See also
List of Professional Rodeo Cowboys Association Champions
List of ProRodeo Hall of Fame inductees
Professional Rodeo Cowboys Association
Women's Professional Rodeo Association

References

External links
 Official Website

 
Rodeo in the United States
Cowboy halls of fame
Sports halls of fame
Rodeo
Sports museums in Colorado
Museums in Colorado Springs, Colorado
Museums established in 1979
1979 establishments in Colorado
Sports hall of fame inductees
Rodeo organizations
Rodeo competition series
Awards established in 1979